Chironkamba is a village on the island of Anjouan in the Comoros. According to the 1991 census, the village had a population of 1,487. The current estimate for 2009 is 2,617 people.

References

Populated places in Anjouan